The 1974 Arab League summit was a meeting of Arab leaders held in Rabat, Morocco in October 1974. Leaders to twenty Arab countries were present, including King Hussein of Jordan and Anwar Sadat of Egypt, together with representatives of the Palestine Liberation Organization (PLO). A unanimous resolution was passed which, for the first time, declared the PLO to be the "sole legitimate representative of the Palestinian people." Furthermore, the Arab League resolved that the "oil-rich Arab states ... [provide] multi-annual financial aid to the [states in confrontation with Israel] and the PLO."

The summit shaped the future of the conflict in several ways.  First, it forced King Hussein to relinquish his claim to be able to speak for the Palestinians and to acknowledge that a future Palestinian state would have to be independent of Jordan.  Second, it "weakened the American position.  [U.S. Secretary of State Henry] Kissinger agreed with the Israelis that it was preferable to negotiate with Hussein rather than with the PLO."

A Fatah plot to assassinate Hussein upon his arrival to the summit was uncovered by Moroccan authorities.

See also
 Arab League

References

External links
The Rabat Summit Conference
Seventh Arab League Summit Conference, Resolution on Palestine
King Hussein's address to the nation

1974 Arab League summit
Palestine Liberation Organization
Rabat
Palestinian nationalism
1974 in politics
1974 conferences
1974 in Morocco
Diplomatic conferences in Morocco
20th-century diplomatic conferences
1974 in international relations
20th century in Rabat